Girolamo Benaglio (15th century) was an Italian painter of the Renaissance period, based in Verona where he painted an altar-piece of the Madonna and Saints (1487). He is a relative of Francesco Benaglio.

Sources

15th-century Italian painters
Italian male painters
Painters from Verona
Renaissance painters